Nagylók is a village in the Fejér county of Hungary and its settlement is known as horseshoe burial to its civilians and townspeople. It was first historically recognized as Lok in 1258.

References

External links 
 Street map 

Populated places in Fejér County